James Taylor Burrowes (28 February 1914 – 15 October 2003) was a Jamaican first-class cricketer and medical doctor.

Burrowes was born at Rae Town in the Colony of Jamaica. He later studied in England at St John's College at the University of Oxford as a Rhodes Scholar. While studying at Oxford, he made a single appearance in first-class cricket for Oxford University against a combined Minor Counties team at Oxford in 1934. Opening the batting for Oxford in their only innings, Burrowes was run out for 3 runs. He bowled eight overs across the match, conceding 37 runs without taking a wicket.

After graduating from Oxford, Burrowes became a physician specialising in obstetrics and gynecology. He spent the last eleven years of his life in Miami, where he died in October 2003.

References

External links

1914 births
2003 deaths
People from Kingston, Jamaica
Jamaican Rhodes Scholars
Alumni of St John's College, Oxford
Jamaican cricketers
Oxford University cricketers
Jamaican obstetricians
Jamaican expatriates in the United States
20th-century Jamaican physicians